The 2013 Open Saint-Gaudens Midi-Pyrénées was a professional tennis tournament played on outdoor clay courts. It was the 17th edition of the tournament which was part of the 2013 ITF Women's Circuit, offering a total of $50,000+H in prize money. It took place in Saint-Gaudens, France, on 13–19 May 2013.

Singles entrants

Seeds 

 1 Rankings as of 6 May 2013

Other entrants 
The following players received wildcards into the singles main draw:
  Deniz Khazaniuk
  Victoria Larrière
  Alizé Lim
  Aravane Rezaï

The following players received entry from the qualifying draw:
  Elena Baltacha
  Anna-Lena Friedsam
  Myrtille Georges
  Alison Van Uytvanck

The following players received entry into the singles main draw as lucky losers:
  Séverine Beltrame
  Yuliya Kalabina

Champions

Singles 

  Paula Ormaechea def.  Dinah Pfizenmaier 6–3, 3–6, 6–4

Doubles 

  Julia Glushko /  Paula Ormaechea def.  Stéphanie Dubois /  Kurumi Nara 7–5, 7–6(13–11)

External links 
 2013 Open Saint-Gaudens Midi-Pyrénées at ITFtennis.com
 

2013 ITF Women's Circuit
Engie
2013 in French tennis